The 2008 Kobalt Tools 500 was the fourth race in the 2008 NASCAR Sprint Cup Series, and was held on March 9, 2008 at Atlanta Motor Speedway in Hampton, Georgia, located outside the Georgia state capital.  The race was televised on Fox starting at 1:30 PM US EDT, and broadcast on the Performance Racing Network and Sirius Satellite Radio starting at 1 PM US EDT.

Pre-Race News
A major shakeup at Team Red Bull finds A. J. Allmendinger out of the #84 Toyota and Mike Skinner, who drove the #27 Bill Davis Racing ride last week takes over for four races to give the team feedback on the current information.  Meanwhile, Johnny Benson will replace Skinner in the #27 ride.

Qualifying
Qualifying suffered from a short rain delay in the beginning stages but was finally reopened with Jeff Gordon winning the pole followed by Dale Earnhardt Jr., Martin Truex Jr., Carl Edwards and Bobby Labonte rounding out the top five. Forty-eight cars attempted to make the race but only 43 are able to start a Sprint Cup Race.

Failed to qualify: John Andretti (#34), Johnny Benson (#27), Bill Elliott (#21), Burney Lamar (#08), Ken Schrader (#49).

Race
For the first time since June 1954 (when Al Keller won in a Jaguar on the road course at Linden Airport), a foreign nameplate found its way to the winners' circle as Kyle Busch dominated the field to win his fifth Cup race of his career, and his first win driving for Joe Gibbs Racing. The victory also gave Toyota their first Sprint Cup victory after 40 races. Carl Edwards, still smarting from last week's win that found a loose oil tank, costing him 100 points in the drivers chase, his owner Jack Roush 100 owners' points and suspended crew chief Bob Osborne for six races until April 30 as well as a $100,000 fine, was in the lead until there were 50 laps to go and Edwards' transmission in the #99 Ford blew up, finishing 42nd, and falling deeper out of the top 12.

Much of the pre and post-race talk was about the tires Goodyear supplied to the teams. Tony Stewart claimed that the tires were shoddy in a post-race commentary.  Dale Earnhardt Jr. also said that the tires did not work well on the subject of its grip, while Jeff Gordon claimed that in light of Stewart's gripes that "I think he went a little overboard".  The tiremaker commented the day after that in a press release "if the drivers aren't happy, Goodyear's not happy."

Results

References

Kobalt Tools 500
Kobalt Tools 500
NASCAR races at Atlanta Motor Speedway
March 2008 sports events in the United States